Anjoman-e Sofla (also Romanized as Anjoman-e Soflá; also known as Anjoman and Anjoman-Pā’īn) is a village in Chaypareh-ye Pain Rural District, Zanjanrud District, Zanjan County, Zanjan Province, Iran. At the 2006 census, its population was 345, in 74 families.

References 

Populated places in Zanjan County